Psamathocrita argentella is a moth of the family Gelechiidae. It was described by Frank Nelson Pierce and John William Metcalfe in 1942. It is found in Great Britain, where it has been recorded in salt marshes in Hampshire, Isle of Wight, Sussex, and Dorset.

The wingspan is 10–11 mm. The forewings are white with some black scales, forming a small marking at three-fourths. The hindwings are greyish white.

The larvae feed on the flowers and seeds of Agropyron pungens.

References

Moths described in 1942
Psamathocrita